HMS Reynard was a 10-gun  built for the Royal Navy during the 1820s. She was sold in 1838.

Description
The ship's tonnage was 237 7/94 tons burthen. The Cherokee class was armed with two 6-pounder cannon and eight 18-pounder carronades. The ships had a crew of 52 officers and ratings.

Construction and career
Reynard, the fourth ship of her name to serve in the Royal Navy, was ordered on 2 November 1818, laid down in May 1820 at Pembroke Dockyard, Wales, and launched on 26 October 1820. She was completed for sea in September 1823 at Plymouth Dockyard.

Notes

References

Cherokee-class brig-sloops
1821 ships
Ships built in Pembroke Dock